Mihail Saltaev (born 19 November 1962), is a Soviet and Uzbekistani chess Grandmaster (GM) (1995), Chess Olympiad team silver medalist (1992).

Biography
In 1991, in Azov Mihail Saltaev won a bronze medal with Uzbekistan team in the last Soviet Team Chess Championship. He has also won international chess tournaments in Chemnitz (1990), in Vladivostok (1995), in Moscow (1995, 1996), in Neukloster (2001), in Essen (2002), in Hamburg (2006).

Mihail Saltaev played for Uzbekistan in the Chess Olympiads:
 In 1992, at first reserve board in the 30th Chess Olympiad in Manila (+2, =0, -1) and won team silver medal,
 In 1996, at first board in the 32nd Chess Olympiad in Yerevan (+1, =3, -5),
 In 1998, at fourth board in the 33rd Chess Olympiad in Elista (+4, =5, -2).

Mihail Saltaev played for Uzbekistan in the Men's Asian Team Chess Championship:
 In 1995, at third board in the 11th Asian Team Chess Championship in Singapore (+5, =4, -0) and won team and individual bronze medals.

In 1990, he was awarded the FIDE International Master (IM) title and received the FIDE Grandmaster (GM) title five years later.

References

External links

Mihail Saltaev chess games at 365chess.com

1962 births
Living people
Soviet chess players
Uzbekistani chess players
Chess grandmasters
Chess Olympiad competitors